A Levich constant (B) is often used in order to simplify the Levich equation. Furthermore, B is readily extracted from rotating disk electrode experimental data.

The B can be defined as:

where
 n is the number of moles of electrons transferred in the half reaction (number)
 F is the Faraday constant (C/mol)
 A is the electrode area (cm2)
 D is the diffusion coefficient (see Fick's law of diffusion) (cm2/s)
 v is the kinematic viscosity (cm2/s)
 C is the analyte concentration (mol/cm3)

References

Electrochemical equations
Electrochemistry